ERCS may refer to:
 AN/DRC-8 Emergency Rocket Communications System
 Eagle Ridge Christian School, in Cape Girardeau, Missouri
 East Richland Christian Schools, in St. Clairsville, Ohio
 Emissions Reduction Currency System
 Ethiopian Red Cross Society
 Extended Reference Concrete Syntax

See also 
 ERC (disambiguation)